The 2016 BWF International Challenge was the tenth season of the BWF International Challenge.

Schedule
Below is the schedule released by Badminton World Federation:

Cancelled tournaments 

There is do not have a time table at 2016 BWF Season

Results

Winners

Performance by countries

Tabulated below are the International Challenge based on countries. Only countries who have won a title are listed:

References

BWF International Challenge
BWF International Challenge